2939 Coconino, provisional designation , is a stony Nysian asteroid from the inner regions of the asteroid belt, approximately 6 kilometers in diameter. It was discovered on 21 February 1982, by American astronomer Edward Bowell at Lowell's Anderson Mesa Station in Flagstaff, United States. It is named after the Coconino County in Arizona.

Orbit and classification 

Coconino is a stony S-type asteroid and a member of the main-belt's Nysa family, which is named after its largest member 44 Nysa. It orbits the Sun in the inner main-belt at a distance of 2.0–2.8 AU once every 3 years and 10 months (1,392 days). Its orbit has an eccentricity of 0.16 and an inclination of 4° with respect to the ecliptic.

Physical characteristics

Rotation period 

In February 2005, a rotational lightcurve of Coconino was obtained from photometric observations by astronomer Horácio Correia. Lightcurve analysis gave a well-defined rotation period of 4.68138 hours with a brightness amplitude of 0.46 magnitude.

Diameter and albedo 

According to the survey carried out by NASA's Wide-field Infrared Survey Explorer with its subsequent NEOWISE mission, Coconino measures 5.607 kilometers in diameter and its surface has a high albedo of 0.512, while the Collaborative Asteroid Lightcurve Link assumes a standard albedo for stony asteroids of 0.20 and consequently calculates a larger diameter of 9.40 kilometers, using an absolute magnitude of 12.5.

Naming 

This minor planet was named after the U.S. Coconino County, Arizona, of which the city of Flagstaff with its discovering observatory is the county seat. The word "Coconino" derives from the language of the Hopi Tribe of Arizona. The official naming citation was published by the Minor Planet Center on 17 February 1984.

References

External links 
 Asteroid Lightcurve Database (LCDB), query form (info )
 Dictionary of Minor Planet Names, Google books
 Asteroids and comets rotation curves, CdR – Observatoire de Genève, Raoul Behrend
 Discovery Circumstances: Numbered Minor Planets (1)-(5000) – Minor Planet Center
 

002939
Discoveries by Edward L. G. Bowell
Named minor planets
19820221